Salvador Corona (1895–1990) was a Mexican-American bullfighter and artist.

Life and work

Salvador Corona was born on his family's ranch Hacienda Mideras in the Mexican state of Chihuahua.  Corona’s family moved to Mexico City in 1903 when he was 8.  He attended the New English College in Mexico and then crossed into a career in bull fighting entering the ring for the first time in 1913.  In 1919 in Guadalajara he was gored and turned to painting. He was given his first painting lessons by fellow bullfighter Jose Jimenez.

His traditional self-developed folk art style images depicted pastoral colorful scenes of Maximilian era Mexico painted on white backgrounds.

His work can be divided into three categories: a vice-regal era with European and Creole noblemen mixed with Indians; stylized landscapes of Patscuaro, Acapulco or the Canal of Santa Anita; and his iconographic Mexican Virgins painted in tones of blue, purple, and gold often encrusted with mother of pearl.

Corona moved to Tucson in 1950.  His studio and residence was located at 1701 East Speedway Boulevard, and then 902 North 4th Avenue overlooking Catalina Park.

While in Tucson his work was sold exclusively through Frank Patania Thunderbird shops located next to the Fox Theatre (Tucson, Arizona) and in Josias Joesler designed Broadway Village. His work was owned by U.S. President Franklin D. Roosevelt.

Mural location

 Bates House (Old Mountain Oyster Club): Stone and Toole Avenue Tucson Arizona (interior and exterior)
 Howell Manning House: Tucson Arizona
 Hacienda Corona (Bed & Breakfast and Event Center), Nogales Arizona (extensive; exterior, well preserved)
 Vince's Fine Italian Food, Speedway Blvd. Tucson, Arizona (painted over)
 Jacome Department Store, Tucson Arizona (location of mural panels unknown)
 El Rancho Grande Hotel, Tucson, Arizona
 Frank Patania residence, Catalina Vista, Tucson, Arizona (unknown condition)
 Alex Jacome residence, Tucson, Arizona (unknown condition)
 Charles P. Neumann residence, Tucson, Arizona
 Mitchell A. Ferguson residence, Tucson, Arizona
 Matty Family Residence, Tucson, Arizona, until removed in October, 2013 and donated to the Arizona Historical Society

References
Milton, Corine Holm. Corona: Bullfighter and Artist, Sunstone Press.
Benton, Pat Moran, Arizona Daily Star, Corona now performs magic with paintbrush instead of cape, July 27, 1971.
Cardon, Charlotte, Arizona Artisan, Salvador Corona: A bullfighter turns in his cape for canvas, October 1974.
Cheek, Lawrence W., Tucson Citizen, Portraits of a Tucson Muralist, March 11, 1976 .

External links
 Hacienda Corona
 
 Video 2 of Arizona State Exhibit
 Howell Manning House Website

1895 births
Mexican artists
Mexican bullfighters
American bullfighters
American artists of Mexican descent
Artists from Tucson, Arizona
1990 deaths
Mexican emigrants to the United States